The City is a famous Greek philosophical poem by Constantine Cavafy. It was written in August 1894, originally entitled “Once More in the Same City.” It was then published in April 1910.

Story

Excerpt

Translations
There are several translations of the poem, the most popular one being Keeley and Sherrard (1992). However, several translators have noted that some nuances of Greek have been surrendered for the sake of a 'poetic' translation. Rae Dalven, best known for her translations of Cavafy, focused on the tone of voice and accuracy of language in her translation. John Mavroforgato, an Anglo-Greek academic, titled his translation "The Town".  Diane L. Durante, a student of Greek and Latin has translated the poem more literally.

Cultural impact
An English translation of the poem appears in the appendix of the Lawrence Durrell novel Justine; Cavafy is a character in the work. The narrator of Justine refers to his translation of this poem as "by no means literal".

References

External links
Poem in Greek and English translation thereof (by Edmund Keeley and Philip Sherrard) at the Official Site of the Cavafy Archive

1894 poems
Greek poems
Poems by Constantine P. Cavafy